Asiopsocidae is a family of Psocodea (formerly Psocoptera) belonging to the infraorder Caeciliusetae. The family is composed of 14 known species of barklice in three genera: Asiopsocus, Notiopsocus, and Pronotiopsocus.  One species from each genus has been found in the United States.

References

 Lienhard, C. & Smithers, C. N. 2002. Psocoptera (Insecta): World Catalogue and Bibliography. Instrumenta Biodiversitatis, vol. 5. Muséum d'histoire naturelle, Genève.

Psocoptera families
Caeciliusetae
Psocoptera